2-Hydroxymuconate semialdehyde is formed from catechol by the enzyme catechol 2,3-dioxygenase during the degradation of benzoates. It is hydrolysed into formate and 2-oxopent-4-enoate by 2-hydroxymuconate-semialdehyde hydrolase.

References

Conjugated aldehydes
Keto acids
Vinylogous carboxylic acids
Alpha hydroxy acids
Conjugated dienes
Aldehydic acids